Johan Christian Drejer (born 8 December 1982) is a retired Danish professional basketball player who in March 2008 was released from his contract with Virtus Roma and is a former player of SISU Copenhagen, the Florida Gators, Winterthur FCB and Virtus Bologna.

Professional career 
Drejer was named the Basketligaen Player of the Year in 2002 after averaging 31.6 points and 6.4 rebounds per game. He was also a Danish national team player. He was drafted in the second round of the 2004 NBA draft by the New Jersey Nets with the 51st pick as the first Dane ever drafted by the NBA. This pick was not without controversy as some had been questioning his character because he had quit the Florida Gators basketball team halfway through the previous season. He never played in the NBA.

Retirement 
In his first year of college basketball, Drejer had an injury in his left foot which kept him sidelined for most of the season. The injury remained a problem for the rest of his career. In 2007–08 he had surgery twice but never fully recovered; in March 2008 he was released from his contract by Virtus Roma and on 11 March the Basketball Federation of Denmark (Danmarks Basketball-Forbund) sent out a press release announcing Drejer's retirement.

Notes and references 

1982 births
Living people
Danish expatriate basketball people in Italy
Danish expatriate basketball people in Spain
Danish expatriate basketball people in the United States
Danish men's basketball players
FC Barcelona Bàsquet players
Florida Gators men's basketball players
Liga ACB players
New Jersey Nets draft picks
Pallacanestro Virtus Roma players
SISU BK players
Small forwards
Sportspeople from Copenhagen
Virtus Bologna players